The Fisher Celebrity is a Canadian two-seat, conventional landing gear, single engined, biplane kit aircraft designed for construction by amateur builders. Fisher Flying Products was originally based in Edgeley, North Dakota, United States but the company is now located in Dorchester, Ontario, Canada.

Development
The Celebrity was designed by Fisher Aircraft in the United States in 1989 and was intended to comply with the US Experimental - Amateur-built category, although it qualifies as an ultralight aircraft in some countries, such as Canada. It also qualifies as a US Experimental Light Sport Aircraft.

The construction of the Celebrity is of wood, with the wings, tail and fuselage covered with doped aircraft fabric. An alternate welded 4130 steel fuselage was previously available, but is no longer offered by the manufacturer.  The aircraft features interplane struts and  inverted "V" cabane struts. Like most biplanes, the Celebrity has no flaps. The Celebrity's main landing gear is bungee suspended. Cockpit access is via the lower wing. The company claims an amateur builder would need 600 hours to build the Celebrity.

Specified engines for the Celebrity include the  Continental A-65,  Continental C-85, the  Continental O-200 and the  Lycoming O-235.

By late 2011 more than 55 Celebrities were flying.

In reviewing the Celebrity, John W. Conrad wrote in the July 1992 issue of Sport Pilot Hot Kits and Homebuilts Magazine:

Specifications (Celebrity)

See also

References

External links

Official website

1980s Canadian ultralight aircraft
Light-sport aircraft
Aircraft first flown in 1989
Biplanes
Single-engined tractor aircraft